Kaltenbrunner is a German surname.  Notable people with the surname include:

 Ernst Kaltenbrunner (1903–1946), Austrian-born senior SS official of Nazi Germany, executed for war crimes
 Ernst Kaltenbrunner (footballer) (1937–1967), Austrian footballer
 Gerlinde Kaltenbrunner (born 1970), Austrian mountaineer
 Günter Kaltenbrunner (born 1943), Austrian footballer
 Josef Kaltenbrunner (1888–1951), Austrian footballer

German-language surnames